The Nicholas Newlin House was built in 1742 in Concordville, Delaware County, Pennsylvania by Nicholas Newlin, about a mile west of the Newlin Mill Complex.  The house was listed on the National Register of Historic Places in 1972.   It is located in the Concordville Historic District.

It was built in 1742 by Nicholas Newlin, and is one of the best preserved eighteenth-century houses in Concord Township.  It was built with Flemish bond brickwork and a high stone foundation.  Its asymmetrical windows divide the house into two sections, but they appear to have been built at the same time. The windows are unusually large for a house of its period.  The interior has retained much of its original appearance and includes fine Georgian panelling.

The Newlin family arrived in Pennsylvania in 1683 and purchased  in what was then Chester County.  Nicholas Newlin sold the house in 1751 to Micajah Speakman, who lived there until 1805.

References

Houses on the National Register of Historic Places in Pennsylvania
Houses completed in 1742
Houses in Delaware County, Pennsylvania
1742 establishments in Pennsylvania
National Register of Historic Places in Delaware County, Pennsylvania